Kenneth John Clements (21 December 1905 - 8 January 1992) was an Anglican bishop in Australia.

Clements was educated at Highgate School and the University of Sydney. He trained for ordination at St John's College, Morpeth and was ordained in 1934 and became registrar for the Diocese of Riverina until 1937 when he was appointed Rector of Narrandera. He then held further incumbencies at Tumbarumba and Gunning. Later he was Archdeacon of Goulburn before his consecration to the episcopate as the bishop coadjutor in the Diocese of Goulburn on 29 June 1949. He succeeded, becoming diocesan Bishop of Grafton in 1956. Five years later he was translated to the (by then renamed) Diocese of Canberra and Goulburn – he was elected on 21 February, installed on 15 June 1961 and retired on 30 September 1971.

References

1905 births
People educated at Highgate School
University of Sydney alumni
Anglican archdeacons in Australia
Anglican bishops of Grafton
Anglican bishops of Canberra and Goulburn
20th-century Anglican bishops in Australia
1992 deaths